The Adventures of Napkin Man! is a children's television series created by Tone Thyne and Josh Selig. It premiered in 2013 on CBC Television, as part of the Kids' CBC block. Mixing live action with animation, the series stars Yannick Bisson as Mr. Anthony, a preschool teacher who writes and illustrates stories featuring Napkin Man, a superhero figure, to teach his students how to handle difficult emotions.

The series was produced by Little Airplane Productions and Breakthrough Entertainment.

The series won the Canadian Screen Award for Best Pre-School Program or Series at the 3rd Canadian Screen Awards in 2015, and Bisson won the award for best preschool or children’s show host.

References

External links

2013 American television series debuts
2017 American television series endings
2010s American children's television series
2013 Canadian television series debuts
2017 Canadian television series endings
2010s Canadian children's television series
American children's adventure television series
American preschool education television series
American superhero television series
American television series with live action and animation
Canadian children's adventure television series
Canadian preschool education television series
Canadian superhero television series
Canadian television series with live action and animation
2010s preschool education television series
CBC Kids original programming
Television series about educators
Television series about children
Television series by 9 Story Media Group
Television superheroes
Television series by Little Airplane Productions
English-language television shows